Al-Houthi is the tribal surname of Houthi tribe and it is the surname of four brothers who have or are leading the Zaidi Shia insurgency in Yemen and whose followers are referred to as the Houthis.

 Mohammed al-Houthi
 Hussein al-Houthi
 Abdul-Malik al-Houthi 
 Yahia al-Houthi